Farm to Market Road 1160 (FM 1160) is a farm-to-market road in Wharton County in the U.S. state of Texas. The highway starts at State Highway Loop 523 (Loop 523) in Louise, intersects with Future Interstate 69/U.S. Route 59 outside Louise and continues in a northerly direction for most of its length. Before its end at State Highway 71 (SH 71) near New Taiton, the highway turns directly to the east.

Route description
FM 1160 starts at Loop 523 in Louise and heads north. Loop 523 is also called North Street. The road that extends to the southeast across the Union Pacific Railroad is named Wharton Street. After going north for  through a residential area, FM 1160 crosses Future I-69/US 59 by an overpass. Access is allowed in all directions between FM 1160 and Future I-69/US 59 via entrance and exit ramps. North of Louise, FM 1160 turns sharply east for a short distance before continuing north again. For  FM 1160 and FM 1300 share the right-of-way before coming to a junction where FM 1300 heads to the east. The Raum Rice Dryer is a prominent landmark in the last leg of FM 1160 according to the 1965 USGS Hahn Quadrangle map.

History
On October 5, 1953, the section of FM 1160 east of FM 2092 was canceled and transferred to FM 1300. FM 2092 was transferred to FM 1160. On September 29, 1954 the northern section connecting the highway to SH 71 was added. On December 15, 1954 the description was changed to better describe the  extension that connected the northern end to SH 71.

Major intersections

See also

References

1160
Transportation in Wharton County, Texas